WALR may refer to:

 WALR-FM, a radio station (104.1 FM) licensed to Greenville, Georgia, United States
 WIFN (AM), a radio station (1340 AM) licensed to Atlanta, Georgia, which held the call sign WALR from 1995 to 2009